Thet Oo Maung may refer to:

 Thet people, a Burmese  people from Myanmar
 Eth, a letter (Ð, ð)
 River Thet, a river in Norfolk, England